Sydney Charles Burt (1826–1892) was the first Premier of the Kingdom of Viti (1871–1872). He then served as Attorney General from 1873 to 1874.

Early life

Burt was born in 1831 in Sydney, New South Wales, Australia. He was the son of John Burt and Martha.

Personal life

He married Alice Frances Holmes on 24 June 1851. Burt was the father of five children.

References 

1826 births
1892 deaths
Premiers of Viti
Attorneys-general of Fiji
Ethnic minority Fijian politicians
Australian expatriates in Fiji
British colonial officials